Herniaria cinerea is a species of herb in the family Caryophyllaceae (carpetweeds).

Sources

References 

cinerea
Flora of Malta